"Me and My Shadow" is a 1927 popular song. Officially the credits show it as written by Al Jolson, Billy Rose, and Dave Dreyer, with Jolson and Dreyer being shown on the sheet music as being responsible for the music and Rose the lyrics.  Al Jolson was often given credits on sheet music so he could earn more money by popularizing them, but he played no actual part in writing this song. Jolson never recorded the song although he did use it in the touring version of "Big Boy" in 1927.

Popular recordings in 1927 were by "Whispering" Jack Smith, Nat Shilkret (vocal by Johnny Marvin) and the separate recording by Johnny Marvin himself for Columba Records.  The song became particularly associated with Ted Lewis who used it to close his act. The song has since become a standard, with many artists performing it.

Some other recorded versions
  
Donald O'Connor (no recorded version available, but featured in the 1948 feature film Feudin', Fussin', and a Fightin)
Cliff Adams Singers
Pearl Bailey
Michael Cooney 
Michael Ball and Antonio Banderas (2003)
Elkie Brooks 
Dave Brubeck Quartet (Instrumental) (1951)
James Caan (from the 1975 film Funny Lady) 
Maurice Chevalier (1968)
Holly Cole (from the 1998 album Treasure)
Perry Como (1951)
Bing Crosby (from the 1962 album On the Happy Side)
Vic Damone
Linda Eder
Judy Garland
Jeff Goldblum with Sarah Silverman and Till Brönner (from the 2018 album The Capitol Studios Sessions)
 Michele Hendricks (1990)
Johnny Howard
Ferlin Husky (1957)
Bert Kaempfert
Scrappy Lambert (1927)
Linda Lawson (1960)
Julie London (from the 1968 album Easy Does It)
Peggy Lee (from the 1969 album Is That All There Is?)
Liberace
Mantovani
Billy May and his orchestra (vocal: The Sportsmen) (1950)
The Mills Brothers (1958)
Rose Murphy (1948)
Mandy Patinkin (1989)
 Stephanie Pope (2001)
Lou Rawls (1965)
Frank Sinatra and Sammy Davis Jr. (1962) - added special and timely lyric: "Closer than Bobby is to JFK"
Cyril Stapleton
Lawrence Welk
Robbie Williams and Jonathan Wilkes (2001)
Daniel Ash (1991 in Coming Down)
The Kidsongs Kids on their Let's Put on a Show video and DVD. Solo sung by Debbie Lytton and Julene Renee.
Sam Lanin and his Orchestra

In film and television
In the movie Funny Lady, Billy Rose admits to wife Fanny Brice that the shadow in the song was Nicky Arnstein, Fanny's criminal husband before Rose though, in fact, the song was written in 1927, two years before Rose’s marriage to Brice in 1929.

The song is performed in Terry Gilliam's Time Bandits, for Napoleon. The dwarves perform it very badly and end up fighting. However, Napoleon is actually pleased, as he wants, for entertainment, "little things hitting each other."

The song was used in an episode of The Dick Van Dyke Show, "The Great Petrie Fortune," in which Van Dyke (playing his own uncle) sings the song on a home movie as part of his will. It referred to an old photograph he had had of himself as an infant, with a "shadow" that was actually Abraham Lincoln.

The song is performed in an episode of Maude, "Maude's Musical", (Season 2, Episode 10), by Beatrice Arthur and Esther Rolle as part of a charity show that Maude is putting together.

The song was performed by Rip Taylor and Christopher Knight in the final episode of The Brady Bunch Variety Hour.

The song was performed in an episode of "Gimme a Break!" by Nell Carter and Joey Lawrence.

The song is used in an episode of HBO show Carnivale, (Season 2, Episode 15) sung first by Stroud and then by Brother Justin.

The song is parodied in The 13 Ghosts of Scooby-Doo episode, "Me and My Shadow Demon," in which the main characters, Scooby and Shaggy, fool a crowd of monsters with a musical number. In 1998 it was included on the soundtrack, Scooby-Doo's Snack Tracks: The Ultimate Collection.

The song is performed by Pardon-Me-Pete the Groundhog (voiced by Buddy Hackett) in the 1979 Rankin/Bass television special Jack Frost (TV special).

Performed by Ted Lewis and Eddie Chester in Abbott and Costello's "Hold That Ghost' (1941)."

The song is performed by Frank Sinatra and Sammy Davis Jr. in a commercial for the game Titanfall.

In 2010, DreamWorks began development on an animated film called Me and My Shadow. However, due to scheduling and management issues, the film was canceled. The film would've been the first to blend CGI animation with 2D animation.

The song is also performed in the sitcom "Welcome Back Kotter" by Gabe Kaplan and the actors playing the sweathogs: Ron Palillo, Robert Hegyes, Lawrence Hilton-Jacobs and John Travolta.

On October 9, 2015, the song was performed on The Late Show with Stephen Colbert by host Stephen Colbert and guest James Corden.

On the October 21, 2020 episode of AEW Dynamite, the song was performed by All Elite Wrestling's Chris Jericho and MJF during their "Le Dinner Debonair" segment, with modified lyrics. Wesley Morris of The New York Times recognized the performance as one of the 'Best Performances of 2020'.

References

1927 songs
Songs about loneliness
Songs written by Al Jolson
Songs with lyrics by Billy Rose
Songs with music by Dave Dreyer